Gunung Putri is a district (Indonesian: Kecamatan) in the Bogor Regency, West Java, Indonesia, and is also part of the Jabodetabek metropolitan area (also known as Greater Jakarta). Because of its location, the district has earned itself a sizeably large population of commuters, and a high density of population.

A bedroom community, Gunung Putri has a high density of population, compared to the other districts in the regency, with the district's northern part being a "planned community", complete with house complexes, parks, schools, and other facilities, all being designed and built by real estates.

Apart from that, the central and southern portions of the district are also packed with houses, although the southern part centres more on being an industrial area.

Gallery

References

Districts of Bogor Regency